Younan may refer to the following:

People

Given name
Younan Labib Rizk (1933–2008), Egyptian historian and literary figure
Younan Nowzaradan, or Dr Now, an Iranian-American surgeon, TV personality, and author
Younan Xia (born 1965), a Chinese-American chemist, materials scientist, and bioengineer

Surname
Faia Younan (born 1992), a Syrian singer
Ignatius Joseph III Yonan (or Younan), Syriac Catholic Patriarch of Antioch
Larsa Pippen (née Younan, born 1974), American television personality
Munib Younan (born 1950), a Palestinian bishop of the Evangelical Lutheran Church in Jordan and the Holy Land
Ramses Younan (1913–1966), an Egyptian painter and writer

See also

Younan (یونان), the Persian designation for Greek, a transliteration of Ionia